Irish American journalism includes newspapers, magazines, and the newer media, with coverage of the reporters, editors, commentators, producers and other key personnel.

Beginnings
The  first Catholic newspaper in the United States was The United States Catholic Miscellany of Charleston, South Carolina. It was founded in 1822 by Bishop John England (1786–1842), who had experience as an editor in Ireland. It was renamed Charleston Catholic Miscellany when South Carolina seceded; it ceased publication in 1861 during the Civil War.

Civil War
John Mitchel (1815–1875), a Protestant fighter for Irish independence who had been imprisoned by the British, escaped, came to the U.S. and became the editor of a leading Confederate newspaper in Richmond during the Civil War.

James McMaster, editor of Freeman's Journal in New York, was a cautious moderate Democrat before the Civil War started. Once the shooting began, he turned strongly against the Lincoln administration, and became an angry leader of the antiwar Copperhead movement.

Boston

John Boyle O'Reilly, (1844–1890) was the editor of Boston Pilot.  Other editors included Thomas D'Arcy McGee (1825–1868) and James Jeffrey Roche (1847–1908). Roche joined the staff in 1866, and in 1890 became editor and the leading spokesman for Catholic intellectuals in New England. He was an active liberal Democrat who gave support to labor unions. His Pilot was one of the few newspapers to support William Jennings Bryan in 1896 and 1900.

As the political and intellectual center of Irish America, Boston produced numerous journalists for the secular press, especially the tabloids that attracted an Irish readership. By the 1890s the city's major newspaper, the Boston Globe had become a stronghold, with an editorial staff dominated by Irish Catholics.

New York and Brooklyn

Patrick Ford, (1837–1913) founded the Irish World in New York.; Austin E. Ford  (1857–1896) was editor of the New York Freeman; John Devoy  (1842–1928) was editor of the Gaelic American 1903–1928.

James McMaster (1820–1886), was editor of Freeman's Journal. The son of a Scots-Irish Presbyterian minister, he converted to Catholicism in 1845 and became a journalist. In 1848 he purchased the Freeman's Journal and Catholic Register.  He edited it until his death, giving it a national audience and influence. He quarreled endlessly with other Catholic leaders. As an anti-war Copperhead he was most famous for his arrest in 1861 on treason charges, as his newspaper was suppressed by the federal government for supporting the Confederacy. He was briefly in prison, but allowed to resume publication in 1862.  He was a strong supporter of parochial schools and the papacy.

Pat Scanlan (1894–1983) was the managing editor (1917–1968) of the Brooklyn Tablet, the official paper of the Brooklyn diocese. He was a leader in the fight against the Ku Klux Klan, and in favor of the work of the National Legion of Decency in minimizing sexuality in Hollywood films.  Historian Richard Powers says Scanlan emerged in the 1920s:
as the leading spokesman for an especially pugnacious brand of militant Catholic anti-communism, that of Irish-Americans who, after suffering from 100 years of anti-Catholic prejudice in America, reacted to any criticism of the Church as a bigoted attack on their own hard-won status in American society... He combined a vivid writing style filled with Menckenesque invective, with an unbridled love of controversy. Under Scanlan, the Tablet became the national voice of Irish Catholic anti-communism – and a thorn in the side of New York's Protestants and Jews.

Chicago
James W. Sheahan made the Chicago Times the voice of the Democratic Party in Chicago. It was funded by Senator Stephen A. Douglas, who needed a press after the main Chicago papers deserted him in 1854. Sheahan sold the paper after Douglas died in 1861.

Joseph Medill (1823–1899), born to a Scots-Irish family in Canada, was the co-owner and managing editor of the Chicago Tribune. A Republican politician, he was elected Mayor of Chicago after the great fire of 1871, which destroyed the entire business district, including the Tribune building.

Margaret Buchanan Sullivan (1847–1903), working for the Democratic newspaper, Chicago Times, was Chicago's best-known reporter in the 1870s and 1880s. She was an activist for woman suffrage and for Irish nationalism, as well as an articulate opponent of anti-Catholicism.

James Keeley (1867–1934), a poor Irish Catholic boy in London, emigrated alone in 1883, and worked in numerous newspapers. He was the powerful managing editor of the Chicago Tribune from 1898 to 1914. From 1911 he simultaneously served as founding dean of the school of journalism at the University of Notre Dame, in South Bend, Indiana.

Diocesan newspapers
Practically all dioceses distribute weekly newspapers; Irish editors are common.  Founded in 1912 by Father John F. Noll, the weekly newspaper Our Sunday Visitor is widely distributed at many parishes as a supplement or in coordination with the local paper., It soon became the most popular Catholic newsweekly. It publishes numerous books and the annual  Catholic Almanac. The oldest is the Pittsburgh Catholic, in published continuously since 1844. In Boston the Pilot was purchased by the archdiocese in 1905 and became its official outlet.

The weekly Brooklyn Tablet became the official newspaper of the diocese of Brooklyn in 1908. Now an archdiocese, Brooklyn has always been independent of the archdiocese of New York.

Magazines

America

America is a national weekly magazine published by the Jesuits since 1909. It features news and opinion about Catholicism, and how it relates to American politics and cultural life. Under editor Thomas J. Reese from 1998 to 2005, the magazine published articles and opinion pieces taking positions contrary to official Catholic social teaching on matters such as homosexuality, clerical celibacy, HIV/AIDS, and  the roles of women. Reese was forced to resign in May 2005 under orders  from conservative theologian Cardinal Joseph Ratzinger—the later Pope Benedict XVI—whose Vatican agency had been monitoring America for years.

Catholic World

Commonweal

20th century

William F. Buckley, Jr.

Shortly after graduating Yale, the young Bill Buckley in 1955 founded the political magazine National Review. It not only provided weekly intellectual substance for the Conservatism in the United States, it defined the standards and central issues of a major political movement that finally triumphed in the election of Ronald Reagan in 1980. Besides Numerous novels, Buckley wrote essays and columns that were widely distributed and hosted 1,429 episodes of the television show Firing Line (1966–1999) where he became known for his transatlantic accent and sesquipedalian vocabulary.  Historian George H. Nash said Buckley was "arguably the most important public intellectual in the United States in the past half century... For an entire generation, he was the preeminent voice of American conservatism and its first great ecumenical figure."

Radio and television

Charles Coughlin

Charles Coughlin was a highly controversial Roman Catholic priest based near Detroit. He Started broadcasting has sermons to a national audience, turning increasingly to political topics. He was the first political commentator to use radio to reach a mass audience, as up to thirty million listeners tuned to his weekly broadcasts during the 1930s. Originally a liberal supporter of Democrat Franklin D. Roosevelt, by 1934 he became a harsh critic of Roosevelt as too friendly to bankers. In 1934 he announced a new political organization called the National Union for Social Justice. He wrote a platform calling for monetary reforms, the nationalization of major industries and railroads, and protection of the rights of labor. The membership ran into the millions, but it was not well-organized at the local level. By the late 1930s, Coughlin's program, while still quite popular, focused increasingly on evil bankers and Jews. In 1939 the Roosevelt administration finally forced the cancellation of his radio program and forbade the dissemination through the mail of his newspaper, Social Justice.

Talk radio

One of the first and most popular of the radio talk show hosts from the 1934 to 1950 was Mary Margaret McBride (1899–1976). From an early career in newspaper and magazine writing she moved to WOR radio in New York in 1934. Her daily woman's-advice show presented a kind and witty grandmother figure with a Missouri-drawl. In 1937, she launched on the national CBS radio network a similar and highly successful show. As Mary Margaret McBride, she interviewed figures well known in the world of arts, entertainment, and politics for 45 minutes, using a style recognized as original to herself. In the 1940s the daily audience for her housewife-oriented program numbered from six to eight million listeners.

21st century

Talk show hosts

Ed Sullivan was one of the most prominent television personalities of the 1950s and 1960s.

Chris Matthews is best  known for his nightly hour-long talk show, Hardball with Chris Matthews, which is televised on the cable television channel MSNBC.

See also

Topics
 German American journalism
 History of American newspapers
 Journalism culture

Publications
Catholic World magazine (1865–1996)
 Donahoe's Magazine (1878–1908)
 Gaelic American, New York
 New York Freeman, New York
 Social Justice (periodical) (1936–1942)
 The Pilot (Massachusetts newspaper), Boston

Personalities
 Jimmy Breslin
 Maureen Dowd
 Charles Benedict Driscoll (1885–1951)
 Finley Peter Dunne (1867–1936)
 James Hagerty (1909–1981) - White House Press Secretary from 1953 to 1961 under President Eisenhower
 Pete Hamill
 Sean Hannity
 Magee Hickey
 Mary McGrory (1918–2004) - Washington political reporter and columnist
 Peggy Noonan (born 1950) - author, political analyst and columnist
 Soledad O'Brien - journalist and producer
 Norah O'Donnell
 Bill O'Reilly
 John L. O'Sullivan (1813–1895)
 James Jeffrey Roche (1847–1908)
 Tim Russert (1950–2008) - hosted NBC's Meet the Press, 1991–2008
 Mark Shields (born 1937)
 Brian Williams - NBC News anchor

Notes

Further reading
 Baumgartner, Apollinaris W. Catholic Journalism: A study of its development in the United States, 1789–1930 (Columbia University Press, 1931); brief summaries
 Byrne, James Patrick, Philip Coleman, and Jason Francis King, eds. Ireland and the Americas: culture, politics, and history: a multidisciplinary encyclopedia (3 vol. ABC-CLIO, 2008)
 George Jr, Joseph. "'A Catholic Family Newspaper' Views the Lincoln Administration: John Mullaly's Copperhead Weekly." Civil War History 24.2 (1978): 112-132.
 George, Joseph. "Philadelphia's Catholic Herald: The Civil War Years." Pennsylvania Magazine of History and Biography (1979): 196-221. online
 Glazier, Michael, ed. The Encyclopedia of the Irish in America (University of Notre Dame Press, 1999)
 Hueston Robert Francis. The Catholic Press and Nativism 1840–1869 (New York: Arno Press, 1976; also  ProQuest Dissertations Publishing, 1972. #7226807)
 Joyce William Leonard. Editors and Ethnicity: A History of the Irish-American Press 1848–1883 (New York: Arno Press, 1976; also ProQuest Dissertations Publishing, 1974. #7500727.)
 McMahon, Eileen. "The Irish-American Press." in Sally M. Miller, ed., The Ethnic Press in the United States: A Historical Analysis and Handbook (1987) pp: 177-189. online
 Reilly, Mary Lonan. A history of the Catholic Press Association, 1911–1968 (Scarecrow Press, 1971)
 Rhodes, Leara. The ethnic press: shaping the American dream (Peter Lang, 2010)
 Rodechko, James Paul. Patrick Ford and His Search for America: A Case Study of Irish-American Journalism, 1870–1913 (1979)
 Swan, Patricia B. and James B. Swan. "James W. Sheahan: Stephen A. Douglas Supporter and Partisan Chicago Journalist." Journal of the Illinois State Historical Society (2012) 105#2-3 pp 133–166 in JSTOR
 Walsh, Francis R. "The Boston 'Pilot' Reports the Civil War," Historical Journal of Massachusetts (1981) 9#2 pp 5–16.

External links
 U.S. Diocesan Newspapers
 Online holdings  of the Catholic World from April 1865 – March 1901 at the Making of America website
Full-text transcriptions of The Catholic World

Irish American
American journalism
American journalists by ethnic or national origin
History of mass media in the United States
Catholicism in the United States
Irish-American press